Shaheen Mistri (born 16 March 1971) is an Indian social activist and educator known as the founder of Akanksha Foundation, and social activist, an Indian non-profit educational initiative in Mumbai and Pune, Occupation in CEO of Teach for India since 2008. Books Redrawing India, The Teach for India story, Miss Muglie Goes to Mumbai.

Early life
Shaheen Mistri was born on 16 March 1971 in Mumbai, India, in She grew up in 5 different countries as she moved countries with her father, a senior banker with Citigroup. At the age of eighteen she returns to Mumbai keen to learn more about the city and its slums, when she decided to enroll at the University of Mumbai. Shaheen had always heard about inequalities in India’s education system, but what she saw shocked her. She graduated with a BA degree in Sociology from St. Xavier's College, University of Mumbai and later obtained a MA from the University of Manchester. Shaheen has been an Ashoka Fellow, a Global Leader for Tomorrow at the World Economic Forum, and an Asia Society 21 Leader. Shaheen is the author of the book, Re-drawing India.

Career
Shaheen Mistri, as a young college student, walked into the Mumbai slums and expressed her desire to teach the less privileged children who roamed the streets. Shaheen founded the first Akanksha Center in 1989, enrolling 15 children and employing college friends as volunteers. It eventually evolved into the Akanksha Foundation, a non-profit education project that provided after-school tutoring to children from low-income. Today, Akanksha reaches out to over 6500 children through its School Project Model. The centers and schools are in Mumbai and Pune. Teachers teach children using an innovative methodology, which has won the foundation international honors.

In the summer of 2008, Shaheen founded Teach for India, with an audacious vision of providing an excellent education to all children across India through building a pipeline of leaders committed to ending educational inequity in India. The Teach for India Fellowship enlists India's most promising college graduates and young professionals to spend two years teaching in low-income schools and attempt to bridge the educational gap in the country.

Board memberships
Shaheen serves on the boards of Akanksha Foundation and Simple Education Foundation and is an ex-member of the board of Design for Change, the Thermax Foundation, and Teach for All.

Published works
 Redrawing India: The Teach for India Story (2014)

Awards
 Ashoka Fellow (2001)
 Global Leader for Tomorrow at the World Economic Forum (2002)
 Asia Society 21 Leader (2006)

References

External links
Teach for India official site
Akanksha Foundation official site
About Shaheen Mistri
Mistri at ISB

Ashoka India Fellows
Indian women activists
Women educators from Maharashtra
21st-century Indian educational theorists
University of Mumbai alumni
Parsi people from Mumbai
Living people
1969 births
People from Mumbai
Activists from Maharashtra
Women writers from Maharashtra
Educators from Maharashtra
21st-century Indian women writers
21st-century Indian non-fiction writers
Indian social sciences writers
21st-century women educators